East Intercourse Island is an uninhabited island in the Dampier Archipelago, in the Pilbara, Western Australia. It is around 250 hectares in size.

The island is a major iron ore loading port owned and operated by Pilbara Iron, a subsidiary of Rio Tinto Iron and Titanium (RTIT).

The lay-by berth can be considered a normal berth without a jetty structure that allows up to 50 vessels per year to berth without having to wait for a tidal vessel to sail.

In 1984, the MV Shinho Maru loaded at East Intercourse Island with the first cargo greater than 200,000 tonnes to be dispatched from any Australian port.

On 4 June 2011, the port was the scene of the workplace death of Irish scaffolder Shaun McBride. He fell into the port and drowned after his work platform collapsed.

Nearby Islands
 Mistaken Island
 Haycock Island (Western Australia)
 East Lewis Island
 Intercourse Island
 East Mid Intercourse Island
 West Mid Intercourse Island
 West Intercourse Island

References

Dampier Archipelago
Uninhabited islands of Australia
Rio Tinto Iron Ore